The Old St. Joseph's Cemetery is located at West Eight Street & Enright Avenue in the Price Hill neighborhood of Cincinnati, Ohio. The Cemetery was founded at West Eight Street & Enright Avenue, in 1843 by Rev. John Baptist Purcell, for both English & German speaking Catholics. The Irish section of St. Joseph Cemetery had reached its capacity after the cholera outbreak of 1849, the new cemetery was located two miles (3 km) west. The Germans remained and expanded the West Eight & Enright location.

The first burials were made in January 1843, when a child Joseph Menke and an adult John Herman Dornkamp were laid to rest. Each of the German RC churches had a section in the old cemetery and many of the older monument's inscriptions contain only German.

The main gate is located near West Eighth and Seton Avenues

Notable interments 

 Larry Benton (1897–1953), football player
 Moe Burtschy (1922–2004), baseball player
 Heinrich Hoffman (1836–1894), Civil War veteran and recipient of the Medal of Honor
 Stephen Joseph McGroarty (1830–1870), Civil War general
 Clyde Vollmer (1921–2006), baseball player

References
 Cincinnati, a Guide to the Queen City and Its Neighbors, American Guide Series, The Weisen-Hart Press, May 1943, p. 463

External links
 St. Joseph's Cemetery
 
 Old St. Joseph's Cemetery

Cemeteries in Cincinnati
Roman Catholic cemeteries in Ohio
German-American history
German-American culture in Cincinnati
Roman Catholic Archdiocese of Cincinnati
1843 establishments in Ohio